The 2003 Railway Cup Hurling Championship was the 76th series of the inter-provincial hurling Railway Cup. Three matches were played between 18 October 2003 and 8 November 2003 to decide the title. It was contested by Connacht, Leinster, Munster and Ulster.

Leinster entered the championship as the defending champions.

On 8 November 2003, Leinster won the Railway Cup after a 4-09 to 2-12 defeat of Connacht in the final at the Giulio Onesti Sports Complex in Rome. It was their 23rd Railway Cup title overall and their second title in succession.

Leinster's Henry Shefflin (4-06) and Connacht's Eugene Cloonan (3-09) were the Railway Cup joint top scorers.

Results

Semi-finals

Final

Top scorers

Overall

Single game

Sources

 Donegan, Des, The Complete Handbook of Gaelic Games (DBA Publications Limited, 2005).

References

Railway Cup Hurling Championship
Railway Cup Hurling Championship